SN 393 is the modern designation for a probable supernova that was reported by the Chinese in the year 393 CE. An extracted record of this astronomical event was translated into English as follows:

The second lunar month mentioned in the record corresponds to the period 27 February  to 28 March 393 CE, while the ninth lunar month ran from 22 October to 19 November 393 CE. The bowl-shaped asterism named Wěi is formed by the tail of the modern constellation Scorpius. This asterism consists of the stars in Scorpius designated ε, μ, ζ, η, θ, ι, κ, λ and ν. The guest star reached an estimated apparent magnitude of −1 and was visible for about eight months before fading from sight, whose lengthy duration suggests the source was a supernova. However, a classical nova is not excluded as possibility.

Suggested as supernova 
Before 1975, the observation made by the Chinese between February and March 393 CE was considered to be likely a bright nova with a secondary maximum. At the time, there were only seven possible candidate supernova remnants near where SN 393 was observed. Another discounted remnant was G350.0-1.8, as the expectant expansion rate indicated the supernova occurred around 8,000 years ago. Of the two remaining sources, G348.5+0.1 and G348.7+0.3, were both at the required 10,000 pc. distance and also each had estimated ages of 1,500 years. If true, it seems unlikely such supernovae would be visible to the naked eye over eight months, especially because they occurred close to a particularly dusty part of the galactic plane.

Stephenson and his colleagues preferred the supernova suggestion. In their most recent book and subsequent articles, Stephenson and Green refer to the suggestion by Wang et al. (1997) who suggested G347.3–00.5.

Suggested as classical nova 
The decline time of classical novae is measured typically as the duration of decline by 3 mag from peak. This so-called t3 time ranges from typical 25-30 days (a months or two) for fast novae up to ten months for the slowest known classical novae (and even longer for diffusion induced novae). Thus, this historical transient could easily have been caused by a (slow) classical nova: postulating a peak brightness of (at least) 2 mag for the historical sighting and vanishing to invisibility (>5 mag) within 8 months, it could be a slow nova. The brighter the peak, the faster the nova: if the peak was −1 mag (like Sirius) or −4 (like Venus) and declined to >5 mag within eight months (6 mag or more in eight months) it could also refer to a moderately fast nova. Possible (and certainly not the only) candidates in the Chinese constellation of Wei are according to:

Possible confirmation of SN 393

During 1996, the ROSAT All Sky Survey discovered another nearby supernova remnant, RX J1713.7-3946, which two years later, was suggested as a better match for SN 393.

Supernova remnant RX J1713.7-3946 is consistent with type II or type Ib supernovae.

See also
 Chinese astronomy
 Chinese constellations

References

Historical supernovae
Supernova remnants
Scorpius (constellation)
4th-century natural events
393
93